The 2015 Nigerian Senate election in Borno State was held on March 28, 2015, to elect members of the Nigerian Senate to represent Borno State. Abubakar Kyari representing Borno North, Ahmed Zanna representing Borno Central and Mohammed Ali Ndume representing Borno South all won on the platform of All Progressives Congress.

Overview

Summary

Results

Borno North 
All Progressives Congress candidate Abubakar Kyari won the election, defeating People's Democratic Party candidate Isa Lawan and other party candidates.

Borno Central 
All Progressives Congress candidate Ahmed Zanna won the election, defeating People's Democratic Party candidate Muhammad Baba and other party candidates.

Borno South 
All Progressives Congress candidate Mohammed Ali Ndume won the election, defeating People's Democratic Party candidate Nicolas Msheilza and other party candidates.

References 

Borno State Senate elections
March 2015 events in Nigeria
Born